The Workers Party of Bangladesh is a communist party in Bangladesh. Rashed Khan Menon is the president of the Workers Party of Bangladesh and Anisur Rahman Mollik is the general secretary of the party.

History 
WPB was founded in 1980 by the Bangladesh Communist Party (Leninist), Revolutionary Communist League, Majdur Party and another group. Amal Sen was the founding general secretary.

In 1984 the party split in two factions, both using the name WPB. One group was led by Amal Sen and Nazrul Islam. The other was led by the current president of the party, Rashed Khan Menon. In 1992 they reunited.

The party participated in the programs of the National Committee to Protect Oil, Gas, Mineral Resources, Power and Ports in 2006.

In November 2008, the Workers Party protested the removal of a baul statue by the Roads and Highways Department, and Civil Aviation Authority, Bangladesh following pressure from Islamists near the Zia International Airport.

In 2010, the Haider Akbar Khan Rono led fraction of the Workers Party of Bangladesh (reconstituted) merged with the Communist Party of Bangladesh.

WPB joined the Grand Alliance in 2014, but the party leadership openly questioned the direction of the subsequent 14 Party Alliance after the 2014 election. Rashed Khan Menon was made the Minister for Civil Aviation and Tourism in the Sheikh Hasina led cabinet.

On 26 May 2016, Workers Party of Bangladesh called for the parliamentary membership of Salim Osman to be cancelled for insulting Shyamal Kanti Bhakta, the principal of Piyar Sattar Latif High School.

In the 2018 Bangladesh elections, it contested as part of the Grand Alliance along with the Bangladesh Awami League. Five candidates of the Workers Party used the election symbol of the Awami League, the boat. The candidates were Fazle Hossain Badsha from Rajshahi-2, Mustafa Lutfullah from Satkhira-1, Rashed Khan Menon from Dhaka-8, Tipu Sultan from Barisal-3, and Yeasin Ali from Thakurgaon-3. Three candidates of the party contested using the hammer symbol of the workers party. They were Ahsan Ullah from Comilla-8, Haji Bashirul Alam from Cox's Bazar-1, and Jahirul Haque Tutul from Barisal-2. The Workers Party won four seats in the Jatiya Sangsad in the 2018 Bangladeshi general election. Lutfun Nesa Khan was elected from the reserved women's seat from the Workers Party. The winners were Fazle Hossain Badsha from Rajshahi-2, Mustafa Lutfullah from Satkhira-1, and Rashed Khan Menon from Dhaka-8. The Awami League did not include them in the new cabinet which only had Awami League politiicians.

In February 2021, the Workers Party criticised Awami League for election policy and for not taking a hardline against religion based political parties. In December the party asked the government to send former Prime Minister Khaleda Zia abroad for medical treatment.

See also 

 Revolutionary Workers Party of Bangladesh

References 

1980 establishments in Bangladesh
Anti-revisionist organizations
Stalinist parties
Maoist parties
Communist parties in Bangladesh
International Conference of Marxist–Leninist Parties and Organizations (International Newsletter)
Political parties established in 1980
Political parties in Bangladesh
Maoist organisations in Bangladesh
International Meeting of Communist and Workers Parties